Mary Immaculate and St Peter, New Barnet, is a Roman Catholic church in Somerset Road, New Barnet, north London. The church is within the Diocese of Westminster. The church was built in 1938.

References

External links

1958 in London
20th-century Roman Catholic church buildings in the United Kingdom
Churches in the Roman Catholic Diocese of Westminster
Mary Immaculate
Roman Catholic churches completed in 1958
Roman Catholic churches in the London Borough of Barnet